Edward L. Bolton Jr. is a retired United States Air Force major general who last served as the Deputy Assistant Secretary for Budget of the Office of the Assistant Secretary of the Air Force for Financial Management and Comptroller. In 2013, he was the assistant administrator for the Next Generation Air Transportation System (NextGen) at the Federal Aviation Administration On July 1, 2018, he was hired as senior vice president of Defense 
Systems Group.

References

External links
 

Year of birth missing (living people)
Living people
Place of birth missing (living people)
United States Air Force generals